The 1969 British Hard Court Championships was a combined men's and women's tennis tournament played on outdoor clay courts at The West Hants Club in Bournemouth in England. It was the 40th edition of the tournament and the second edition in the Open Era of tennis. The tournament was held from 28 April through 3 May 1969. John Newcombe, seeded first, and Margaret Court won the first open singles titles while the men's team of Bob Hewitt and Frew McMillan and the women's team of Margaret Court and Judy Tegart won the doubles titles. The poor state of the courts led to a protest by a number of players. The tournament made a financial loss due to higher expenses compared to the previous edition and poor weather during the final two days.

Finals

Men's singles
 John Newcombe defeated  Bob Hewitt 6–8, 6–3, 5–7, 6–4, 6–4

Women's singles
 Margaret Court defeated  Winnie Shaw 5–7, 6–4, 6–4

Men's doubles
 Bob Hewitt /  Frew McMillan defeated  Jean-Claude Barclay /  Robert Wilson 6–4, 6–2, 2–6, 9–7

Women's doubles
 Margaret Court /  Judy Tegart defeated  Ada Bakker /  Marijke Schaar 6–1, 6–4

Mixed doubles
 Virginia Wade /  Bob Maud defeated   Fay Toyne-Moore /  Jimmy Moore 6–2, 6–2

References

External links
 International Tennis Federation (ITF) tournament details

Clay court tennis tournaments
British Hard Court Championships
British Hard Court Championships
British Hard Court Championships
British Hard Court Championships
British Hard Court Championships